Stanisław Paczka (16 September 1945 – 1 February 1969) was a Polish luger. He competed in the men's doubles event at the 1968 Winter Olympics.

References

External links
 

1945 births
1969 deaths
Polish male lugers
Olympic lugers of Poland
Lugers at the 1968 Winter Olympics
People from Suwałki County